The IMAM Ro.43 was an Italian reconnaissance single float seaplane, serving in the Regia Marina between 1935 and 1943.

Design and development
The Ro.43 was designed to meet a 1933 requirement by the Regia Marina (the Italian navy) for a catapult-launched reconnaissance aircraft to equip the Maritime Reconnaissance Squadrons operating from its ships. The specification called for a speed of 240 km/h (149 mph), with a range of 600 km (370 mi) or an endurance of 5.5 hours. Other contenders were the Piaggio P.18 and P.20, CMASA MF.10, CANT Z.504 and Macchi C.76.

Derived from the Ro.37 Lince reconnaissance aircraft, by the same designer, the Ro.43 first flew in 1934. The plane was built of steel tubes and wood covered by soft alloy and fabric. It was a two-seat biplane with folding gull upper and inverse gull lower wings, lightly armed and capable of around 300 km/h (185 mph) and over 1,000 km (620 mi) range. This performance more than met the requirements of the specification, and so it was declared the winner.

Despite this, the Ro.43 had serious problems. Its lightweight structure meant that it was too delicate for buoyancy at sea, and it had poor sea-handling qualities. These problems meant that when it was launched it was quite normal not to recover it at sea, forcing the aircraft to return to land before alighting.

Operational history

The aircraft's good endurance meant that seaplanes could still be useful in the constrained Mediterranean. Six Ro.43 launched from light cruisers played a role in spotting the British fleet during the battle of Calabria, in the opening months of the war. One of them, departing from the cruiser Eugenio di Savoia, kept visual contact with the battleship HMS Warspite during the exchange of fire between the British capital ship and the Italian battleship Giulio Cesare before being chased off by a Sea Gladiator from the carrier HMS Eagle.

Near the end of 1940, a lone Ro.43 launched by the heavy cruiser Bolzano was the first to spot the British fleet at the beginning of the battle of Cape Spartivento, at 9:45 while the seaplane of Gorizia located the British convoy at 11:45. British Skuas from the carrier HMS Ark Royal claimed to have shot down one seaplane after a fruitless bombing on the Italian fleet, purportedly an Ro.43 from the battleship Vittorio Veneto. The performance of the Ro.43s in this battle was eulogized by the Italian supreme command.
Another Ro.43 launched by Vittorio Veneto pinpointed the British cruiser squadron at 6:35 during the engagement near Gavdos island, the prelude of the Battle of Cape Matapan, on 28 March 1941.

A cruiser-borne Ro.43 signaled the presence of the British convoy by dropping flares during the Second Battle of Sirte, while another seaplane from the battleship Littorio directed the fire of the Italian fleet onto the British squadron before disengaging at 17:24.

The Ro.43s continued to take part in shipborne operations as late as June 1942, during the Italian cruiser attack on the Harpoon convoy. One of the Italian seaplanes was shot down by a Bristol Beaufighter from Malta in the course of this action.

One hundred and five aircraft were in service at the start of World War II, more than enough to equip the major surface units of the Italian Navy, but soon a better aircraft was requested, possibly a navalized fighter. This resulted in a small series being built of a naval version of the Reggiane Re.2000 that could be catapulted but was not fitted with floats so had to either return to a land base or ditch, in a similar fashion to the Hawker Hurricanes operated by British CAM ships. The best feature were the folding wings, but even so the maximum carried on board was usually two. This, together with the modest possibilities of recovery and the lack of experience with naval aviation (even though the Italian Navy possessed a seaplane carrier, the Giuseppe Miraglia) limited the use of the aircraft in combat.

Approximately 200-240 were produced until 1941, with 48 still in service in 1943.

Operators

Regia Marina
Regia Aeronautica

Specifications (Ro.43)

See also

References

Further reading
 
 
 Lembo, Daniele Officine Meccaniche Meridionali, Aerei nella storia magazione, Delta editions, Parma, oct-nov 2003

External links

 Imam Ro 43
 La scheda sul Ro.43 dell'Aeronautica Italiana 

Ro.43
1930s Italian military reconnaissance aircraft
Floatplanes
Biplanes
Single-engined tractor aircraft
Aircraft first flown in 1934